Batrachedra eucola is a species of moth in the family Batrachedridae. It is endemic to New Zealand and found both the North and South Islands. This species frequents scrubland habitat and is on the wing in January and February. B. eucola can be easily distinguished from its close relatives as it larger in size, has a pronounced palpi tuft and has full neuration of its hindwings.

Taxonomy 

This species was first described by Edward Meyrick in 1889. George Hudson discussed and illustrated this species in his 1928 publication The Butterflies and Moths of New Zealand. The holotype specimen of this species was collected near the Bealey River in North Canterbury. This specimen is now held at the Natural History Museum, London.

Description 

Meyrick described the species as follows:
B. eucola can be easily distinguished from its close relatives as it larger in size, has a pronounced palpi tuft and has full neuration of its hindwings.

Distribution 
This species is endemic to New Zealand. Along with northern Canterbury, this species has also been collected at Whangarei, National Park, Wellington, Aorere River near Nelson, and Hope Arm, in Fiordland.

Biology and behaviour 
This species is on the wing in January and February. This species frequents scrubland habitat.

References

Batrachedridae
Moths of New Zealand
Moths described in 1889
Endemic fauna of New Zealand
Taxa named by Edward Meyrick
Endemic moths of New Zealand